{{Speciesbox
| image = Tolumnia urophylla (as Oncidium urophyllum) - Edwards vol 28 (NS 5) pl 54 (1842).jpg
| image_caption = Illustration of Tolumnia urophylla
| genus = Tolumnia (plant)
| species = urophylla
| authority = (Lodd. ex Lindl.) Braem
| synonyms =
Oncidium urophyllum Lodd. ex Lindl. (basionym)Oncidium urophyllum f. flavum R.J.Midgett
}}Tolumnia urophylla'' is a species of orchid endemic to the Lesser Antilles.

External links

urophylla
Orchids of the Caribbean
Orchids of Îles des Saintes
Flora of the Leeward Islands
Flora without expected TNC conservation status